Barry White's Greatest Hits is the first greatest hits album released by the singer Barry White. It was originally released as a vinyl LP in 1975, and re-released on CD in 1988.

The original vinyl record contained all alternate versions of the songs.  When reissued on CD, tracks 2, 3, 6, and 10 were replaced with the original versions, the latter two in edited form.

Track listing

"What Am I Gonna Do with You" - 3:33
"You're the First, the Last, My Everything" - 4:35
"Can't Get Enough of Your Love, Babe" - 4:31
"Honey Please, Can't Ya See" - 3:14
"Love Serenade" - 7:06
"Never, Never Gonna Give Ya Up" - 4:50
"I'm Gonna Love You Just a Little More Baby" - 4:12
"I've Found Someone" - 3:41
"I've Got So Much to Give" - 3:09
"Standing in the Shadows of Love" - 5:21

Charts

Certifications and sales

References

1975 greatest hits albums
Barry White albums
20th Century Fox Records compilation albums